The 1942 Brooklyn Dodgers team won 104 games in the season, but fell two games short of the St. Louis Cardinals in the National League pennant race. The Dodgers' 104 wins tied the 1909 Chicago Cubs for the most wins by a team that failed to finish first in its league (or, since 1969, division); this record lasted until 2021, when the Dodgers won 106 games but finished a game behind the San Francisco Giants in the NL West.

Offseason 
 December 9, 1941: Heinie Mueller was purchased by the Dodgers from the Philadelphia Phillies.
 December 10, 1941: Mace Brown was purchased from the Dodgers the Boston Red Sox.
 December 10, 1941: Don Padgett was purchased by the Dodgers from the St. Louis Cardinals.
 December 10, 1941: Johnny Rizzo was purchased by the Dodgers from the Philadelphia Phillies.
 December 12, 1941: Pete Coscarart, Luke Hamlin, Babe Phelps and Jimmy Wasdell were traded by the Dodgers to the Pittsburgh Pirates in exchange for Arky Vaughan.
 March 13, 1942: Billy Sullivan was purchased by the Dodgers from the Detroit Tigers.
 March 23, 1942: Frenchy Bordagaray was purchased by the Dodgers from the New York Yankees.
 Prior to 1942 season: Steve Nagy was signed as an amateur free agent by the Dodgers.

Regular season 
The Dodgers were 73–30 and 10 games ahead on August 4, but the Cardinals went on to win 45 of their last 56 to grab the NL title. To exacerbate the problem, the Dodgers had also dropped several close games to St. Louis in September.

Defending NL batting champ Pete Reiser, hitting .380, was sidelined in mid-season after repeatedly crashing into the unpadded outfield wall in Ebbets Field. While he recovered from a fractured skull, Brooklyn could not keep up their early pace. A healthy Reiser may very well have made up the two-game difference.

Season standings

Record vs. opponents

Notable transactions 
 April 30, 1942: Schoolboy Rowe was purchased by the Dodgers from the Detroit Tigers.
 May 19, 1942: Babe Dahlgren was purchased by the Dodgers from the Chicago Cubs.
 August 30, 1942: Bobo Newsom was purchased by the Dodgers from the Washington Senators.

Roster

Player stats

Batting

Starters by position 
Note: Pos = Position; G = Games played; AB = At bats; R = Runs; H = Hits; Avg. = Batting average; HR = Home runs; RBI = Runs batted in; SB = Stolen bases

Other batters 
Note: G = Games played; AB = At bats; R = Runs; H = Hits; Avg. = Batting average; HR = Home runs; RBI = Runs batted in; SB = Stolen bases

Pitching

Starting pitchers 
Note: G = Games pitched; GS = Games started; CG = Complete games; IP = Innings pitched; W = Wins; L = Losses; ERA = Earned run average; BB = Bases on balls; SO = Strikeouts

Other pitchers 
Note: G = Games pitched; GS = Games started; CG = Complete games; IP = Innings pitched; W = Wins; L = Losses; ERA = Earned run average; BB = Bases on balls; SO = Strikeouts

Relief pitchers 
Note: G = Games pitched; IP = Innings pitched; W = Wins; L = Losses; SV = Saves; ERA = Earned run average; BB = Bases on balls; SO = Strikeouts

Awards and honors 
1942 Major League Baseball All-Star Game
Arky Vaughan starter
Joe Medwick starter
Pete Reiser starter
Billy Herman reserve
Mickey Owen reserve
Pee Wee Reese reserve
Whit Wyatt reserve
TSN Major League All-Star Team
Mickey Owen

League top five finishers 
Dolph Camilli
 #2 in NL in home runs (26)
 #2 in NL in RBI (109)
 #3 in NL in walks (97)

Hugh Casey
 MLB leader in saves (13)

Curt Davis
 #3 in NL in ERA (2.36)

Kirby Higbe
 #3 in NL in strikeouts (115)

Ducky Medwick
 #2 in NL in doubles (37)
 #4 in NL in RBI (96)

Pistol Pete Reiser
 NL leader in stolen bases (20)
 #4 in NL in batting average (.310)

Farm System

LEAGUE CHAMPIONS: Santa Barbara

Notes

References 
Baseball-Reference season page
Baseball Almanac season page

External links 
1942 Brooklyn Dodgers uniform
Brooklyn Dodgers reference site
Acme Dodgers page 
Retrosheet

Los Angeles Dodgers seasons
Brooklyn Dodgers season
Brooklyn
1940s in Brooklyn
Flatbush, Brooklyn